Pochalla Airport is an airport serving Pochalla in South Sudan.

Location

Pochalla Airport  is located in Pochalla County in Boma State, in the town of Pochalla, in eastern South Sudan, at the international border with Ethiopia.

The geographic coordinates of Pochalla Airport are: 7° 10' 48.00" N, 34° 5' 42.00"E (Latitude: 7.1800; Longitude: 34.0950). The airport has a single unpaved runway.

Overview

Pochalla Airport is a small civilian airport that serves the town of Pochalla and Boma National Park. There are no scheduled flights at Pochalla Airport at this time.

External links
 Location of Pochalla Airport At Google Maps

See also

 Jonglei
 Greater Upper Nile
 List of airports in South Sudan

References

Airports in South Sudan
Pibor Administrative Area